Nordre Follo is a municipality in the Oslo region in Viken county. Norway. The area was part of Akershus County from the Middle Ages to 2020. Nordre Follo was established on 1 January 2020 by the merging of Ski and Oppegård municipalities.

Environment
Contaminants from thousands of truckloads of slate (that were dumped on two properties that were not prepared as waste sites), are constantly leaking into stream Snipetjernsbekken, which flows into Lake Gjersjøen—the fresh water source for around 49,500 people in Oppegård and the municipality Ås; the stream has [a high concentration, or] much heavy metals and the pH is low. The magnitude of the problem has been known since 2006. In 2022, the government started its case-work thru Environment Agency and Radiation Protection Authority.

Notable people

References

Municipalities of Viken (county)